Nursen Güven is a Turkish artist.
She is Turkeys first and only female muralist. Her husband is Güvenç Güven, one of the most important representatives of   İznik Çini.
She teaches at Haliç Çini Merkezi and Ayvansaray Eğitim Birimi.
In 1995 she and her husband opened their own workshop.

Education
In 1972 she entered and in 1980 graduated from the industrial design department of the State Fine Arts Academy. After this, due to her interest in traditional Turkish arts, she entered into the Traditional Turkish Arts Department at the Mimar Sinan University. There she was educated in calligraphy, tezhib, miniature, Çini, Klasik Cilt, Carpet/Rug and old cloth patterns. In 1985 she graduated with a masters in Klasik Cilt.

She received her calligraphy education from Hattat Mahmut Öncü and Emin Barın and also learned from Hasan Çelebi and Ali Alparslan. She was educated in illumination by Tahsin Aykutalp. She was educated in miniature by Neşe Aybey and klasik cilt by İslam Seçen and carpetry by Yusuf Durul and drawing by Aydın Uğurlu.

Exhibitions 
1988 - Beyoğlu Municipality Art Gallery

1989 - Yapı Kredi Bank Beyoğlu Gallery Collaborative Exhibition

1990 - Basın Museum Art Gallery

1991 - Konya Dostlar Group Exhibition

1996 - Aniques and Art Fair at the Swiss Hotel

References

Citations

Sources 

Academy of Fine Arts in Istanbul alumni
Turkish women artists
20th-century Turkish artists
21st-century Turkish artists
Living people
Turkish women academics
Turkish miniaturists
Year of birth missing (living people)